The June 1927 Irish general election was to elect the 5th Dáil held on Thursday, 9 June following the dissolution of the 4th Dáil on 23 May 1927. It was the first election contested by Fianna Fáil, which had been formed a year earlier when Éamon de Valera, leader of the abstentionist Anti-Treaty Sinn Féin, failed to convince the party to take their seats if and when the Oath of Allegiance were abolished. Most of Sinn Féin's TDs, as well as the bulk of its support, shifted to Fianna Fáil. The impact of this shift saw Sinn Féin all but decimated; it was reduced to five seats. This was for many years the end of the party as a major force in the southern part of the island; it would not win more than 10 seats at an election until 2011, by which time it had undergone fundamental transformation. This election cemented Fianna Fáil as a major party; it and Cumann na nGaedheal/Fine Gael remained the two largest parties in Ireland until 2011.

The 5th Dáil assembled at Leinster House on 23 June to nominate the President of the Executive Council and Executive Council of the Irish Free State for appointment by the Governor-General. W. T. Cosgrave was re-appointed leading a government of Cumann na nGaedheal.

Fianna Fáil took the oath of allegiance and its seats in the Dáil on 12 August 1927. Fianna Fáil's decision to take up its seats ended Cumann na nGaedheal's working majority, forcing Cosgrave into a minority government which proved unstable. After government victories in two by-election, Cosgrave sought a dissolution on 25 August and a second election of that year was held in September 1927.

Result

|}

Voting summary

Seats summary

Government formation
When the 5th Dáil first met on 23 June 1927, there were 50 TDs still abstaining. Cumann na nGaedheal formed the 3rd Executive Council of the Irish Free State with the support of the Farmers' Party and 13 Independents. This government proved unstable once Fianna Fáil took their seats.

Changes in membership

First time TDs
Tadhg Crowley
Patrick Boland
Andrew Fogarty
John Jinks
Michael Keyes
Michael Óg McFadden
Thomas Mullins
Patrick O'Dowd
Matthew O'Reilly
Timothy Quill
Jasper Wolfe

Outgoing TDs
Cornelius Connolly (Retired)
Patrick McFadden (Lost seat)

Notes

References

Ireland
General election, 1927a
General election, 1927a
General elections in the Republic of Ireland
5th Dáil
June 1927 events